Leonard William Harris (born 22 September 1943) is an Australian politician who was a One Nation Senator representing the state of Queensland from 1999 until 2005. He took his seat in September 1999, after a successful challenge to the election in October 1998 of Heather Hill, on the basis that, although a naturalised Australian, she had not renounced her childhood United Kingdom citizenship and was thus ineligible to sit in the Australian Parliament.

Political career
Harris was born in Brisbane and was a self-employed businessman and gold miner prior to being chosen as the number two Senate candidate for One Nation at the 1998 election.

He came briefly to prominence during the 2003 debate on the legislative reforms to tertiary education, proposed by federal Education Minister Brendan Nelson. After initially indicating he would vote against the legislation, Harris later changed his mind and allowed the reform package to pass, much to the annoyance of student organisations.

By the time of the 2004 election One Nation was seriously in decline, and Harris was expected to struggle to retain his seat. With a drastic fall in the One Nation vote nationally, he lost his seat, polling only 0.2 of a quota. His term expired on 30 June 2005.

References

1943 births
One Nation members of the Parliament of Australia
Members of the Australian Senate
Members of the Australian Senate for Queensland
Politicians from Brisbane
Living people
21st-century Australian politicians
20th-century Australian politicians